State Route 43 (SR 43) is a north–south state highway in the U.S. State of California, routed along the southern San Joaquin Valley between SR 119 southwest of Bakersfield and SR 99 in Selma. SR 43 runs roughly parallel to SR 99, connecting the towns of Shafter, Wasco, Corcoran, Hanford, and Selma.

Route description
The route begins southwest of Bakersfield at the SR 119 junction as Enos Lane. It travels north on Enos Lane through rural farmland and a local raceway as SR 43 quickly crosses I-5. It continues north for a few miles before reaching SR 58. From there, they overlap for one mile. At the "T" junction, SR 58 turns due west to Buttonwillow while SR 43 continues north. A mile after intersecting 7th Standard Road, the road name changes to Beech Ave. At the intersection of Los Angeles St., Beech Ave., and Santa Fe Way, SR 43 angles northwest, running parallel to the BNSF tracks. At this point the name changes to Central Valley Highway. Before intersecting Lerdo Highway, which serves Minter Field, the road expands to four lanes. As SR 43 goes through Shafter, the highway continues as a four-lane divided highway until reaching Wasco at Poso Dr. where it returns to two lanes. The name now changes to F Street. After intersecting SR 46, SR 43 briefly travels east along SR 46 before turning north regaining the Central Valley Highway designation. At Pond St, the route turns northwest. It continues as the route goes through Corcoran, intersecting the western terminus of SR 137 (Whitney Ave.) North of Corcoran, the route turns north splitting off from the BNSF Railway tracks. It continues north through Hanford where it reaches the SR 198 interchange before reaching Selma. SR 43 terminates at SR 99 near the intersection of Highland Avenue and Floral Avenue.

SR 43 is part of the California Freeway and Expressway System, but except for a portion near SR 46, is not part of the National Highway System, a network of highways that are considered essential to the country's economy, defense, and mobility by the Federal Highway Administration.

History

State Route 43 is the combination of two different legislative routes. The northern segment was adopted as a state route in 1933 as Legislative Route 135. It was defined to run from LRN 10 (currently SR 198) near Hanford to LRN 129 (currently SR 65) near Ducor via Corcoran and Earilmart. Originally, the route started in Ducor and traveled west on Ave. 65. It went through Earilmart to Central Valley Highway, where it joins the current route. In 1951, the route and terminus was changed from Ducor to the junction of LRN 33 (currently SR 46) and LRN 139 (current routing of SR 43) in Wasco, eliminating the route along Ave. 56. 

In 1959, a second disconnected segment was added that ran from the Kings County Line to LRN 4 (currently SR 99) near Selma. The southern segment was adopted as a state route in 1933 as Legislative Route 139. It was defined to run from LRN 140 (currently SR 119) to LRN 33 in Wasco.

In 1964, all of the state routes were renumbered. LRN 135 and LRN 139 were combined, and all gaps were filled to make one continuous route from SR 119 to SR 99 near Selma. This route was named and signed as SR 43.

Future
The Kings County Association of Governments has plans to improve the state highways within the county. Developers are interested in building distribution warehouses in Kings County because of its strategic location midway between the Los Angeles and San Francisco Bay areas, but they are currently turned off by the lack of freeway access. For SR 43, the plan is to upgrade the entire segment within the county to a freeway. However, Kings County voters have shown little interest in passing any transportation taxes to fund these projects.

Major intersections

See also

 List of state highways in California

References

External links

 Caltrans: Route 43 highway conditions
 California Highways: SR 43
 California @ AARoads.com - State Route 43

043
State Route 043
State Route 043
State Route 043
State Route 043
State Route 043
State Route 043